The Traitor is a 1936 American Western film directed by Sam Newfield and starring Tim McCoy, Frances Grant, and Frank Melton. It was released on August 29, 1936.

Cast list
 Tim McCoy as Tim Vallance
 Frances Grant as Mary Allen
 Frank Melton as Jimmy Allen
 Pedro Regas as Pedro Moreno
 Frank Glendon as Big George
 Karl Hackett as Captain John Hughes (credited as Carl Hackett)
 Dick Curtis as Morgan
 Roger Williams as Sheriff
 Jack Rockwell as Smoky
 Dick Botiller as Remos

References

American Western (genre) films
1936 Western (genre) films
1936 films
American black-and-white films
Films directed by Sam Newfield
1930s American films
1930s English-language films